Chu Chin Chow is a 1934 British musical film directed by Walter Forde and starring George Robey, Fritz Kortner and Anna May Wong.  It was an adaptation of the hit musical Chu Chin Chow by Oscar Asche and Frederick Norton. It was shot at the Islington Studios of Gainsborough Pictures in London. The film's sets were designed by the art director Ernö Metzner.

The movie's title inspired the name of the Marvel Comics monster Fin Fang Foom.

Cast
 George Robey as Ali Baba 
 Fritz Kortner as Abu Hasan 
 Anna May Wong as Zahrat 
 John Garrick as Nur-al-din Baba 
 Pearl Argyle as Marjanah
 Malcolm McEachern as Abdullah
 Dennis Hoey as Rakham, 
 Sydney Fairbrother as Mahbubah Baba
 Laurence Hanray as Kasim Baba 
 Frank Cochrane as Mustafa 
 Thelma Tuson as Alcolom Baba, 
 Francis L. Sullivan as The Caliph
 Gibb McLaughlin as The Caliph's Vizier 
 Kiyoshi Takase as Entertainer at Feast

Critical reception
The New York Times wrote, "the cry this morning should be 'The Redcoats are coming!' Britain's long-heralded invasion of the American film market has begun with the offerings at the Roxy of Chu Chin Chow, a tuneful, spectacular and robust adaptation of the Oscar Asche comic operetta."

See also
Chu-Chin-Chow (1923)

References

External links

Lobby poster depicting Anna May Wong on the cover(c. moviegoods)
Allmovie synopsis of the film (with trailer)

1934 films
1934 musical films
British musical films
Films directed by Walter Forde
British black-and-white films
Remakes of British films
Sound film remakes of silent films
British films based on plays
Films based on musicals
Films based on Ali Baba
1930s English-language films
1930s British films
Islington Studios films
Gainsborough Pictures films